Demarnia Lloyd is a New Zealand musician, known for her work with the group Cloudboy. She has also produced comics. Lloyd was the inaugural artist in residence at Smith's Grainstore, Oamaru (2001). She has been in a number of bands a well as Cloudboy (Munky Kramp, Mink) and also works as a solo artist.

Personal life 
Lloyd is the sister of musician Jody Lloyd and the two have often appeared on each other's recordings.

References 

New Zealand comics artists
New Zealand female comics artists
New Zealand musicians
Flying Nun Records artists
Living people
Year of birth missing (living people)